Senn Kreol (In English: Creole Channel, French: Chaîne Créole) is a television channel in Mauritius, owned by the Mauritius Broadcasting Corporation.

Programming
2 Kouzin Sek
Ti Gale
Refle Nou Zil
Itinerer
Itinerer Rodrig
Dossier Senn Kreol
Sports Moris
Balad dan Villaz
Valer Artis
Arsiv MBC
Klip Kompil (Musical Show)
Bonzour Nu Zil
Kitikoui
Lavi Zoli en XXL
Morisien Kone Ou Drwa ek Devoir 
Etre Femme
Memwar Nu Zanset
Beauty Queen
Morisien Kone Ou La Santé
Mazavarou (Seychellois cooking show from SBC)
Kapatya (Seychellois discovery show from SBC)
Knockout (Seychellois show from SBC)
Tremolo (Seychellois show from SBC)

References

Senn Kreol

Mauritius Broadcasting Corporation
Television channels in Mauritius
Mauritian Creole